The Greek community in Venice dates back to the Middle Ages, when the Republic of Venice was still formally part of the Byzantine Empire. Settled mostly in the sestiere of Castello, it reached its height in the centuries after the Fall of Constantinople, when many Greeks, including merchants, soldiers, and scholars, fled the Ottoman conquest. Tied to the Greek world through its extensive overseas possessions, the city became a major center for Greek education and the Modern Greek Enlightenment, but declined after the Fall of the Venetian Republic and the establishment of the modern Greek state. The community's property is now largely owned and managed by the Hellenic Institute of Byzantine and Post-Byzantine Studies in Venice.

Because of the long-standing relationship with Constantinople, there is also a noticeable Orthodox presence in the city. Since 1991, the Church of San Giorgio dei Greci in Venice has become the see of the Greek Orthodox Archdiocese of Italy and Malta and Exarchate of Southern Europe, a Byzantine-rite diocese under the Ecumenical Patriarchate of Constantinople.

See also
 Greek diaspora
 Scuola dei Greci
 San Giorgio dei Greci
 Flanginian School

References

Bibliography

External links
 Hellenic Institute for Byzantine and Post-Byzantine Studies in Venice

History of Venice
Venice
Venetian Greeks
Castello, Venice